B2G may refer to:
 B2G OS, community-developed successor to Firefox OS
 Battery-to-grid, specifically vehicle-to-grid
 Be2gether, a music and arts festival held in Lithuania
 Boot to Gecko, the codename for Firefox OS, a mobile operating system proposed by Mozilla and built upon its Gecko layout engine
 Bridge to Grace, an American rock band from Atlanta, Georgia
 Business-to-government
 Great Lakes B2G, a US Navy carrier-borne bomber

See also
B2B
B2C